Kurabagatti is a village in Belgaum district in Karnataka, India.

References

Villages in Belagavi district